Nekaela Butler (born 4 June 2001) is an Australian rules footballer who played one match for the Richmond Football Club in the 2020 AFL Women's season (AFLW). Butler was drafted by Richmond with the club's sixth selection and the 55th pick overall in the 2019 AFL Women's draft and made her debut in the final round of the 2020 season, a loss to St Kilda at RSEA Park. At the end of the season, Butler was delisted by Richmond. She now plays at Donvale, and is not single.

Statistics
Statistics are correct to the end of the 2020 season.

|- style="background-color: #eaeaea"
! scope="row" style="text-align:center" | 2020
|style="text-align:center;"|
| 22 || 1 || 0 || 0 || 2 || 3 || 5 || 1 || 3 || 0.0 || 0.0 || 2.0 || 3.0 || 5.0 || 1.0 || 3.0
|- 
|- class="sortbottom"
! colspan=3| Career
! 1
! 0
! 0
! 2
! 3
! 5
! 1
! 3
! 0.0
! 0.0
! 2.0
! 3.0
! 5.0
! 1.0
! 3.0
|}

References

External link 

2001 births
Living people
Richmond Football Club (AFLW) players
Australian rules footballers from Victoria (Australia)